Jeremy Kelly (born October 21, 1997) is an American soccer player who plays as a defender for Memphis 901 in the USL Championship.

Youth 
Kelly signed an amateur contract with Carolina RailHawks on March 17, 2016. His amateur status would allow him to play college soccer for North Carolina Tar Heels when their college season began later in the year. 

Kelly played four years at UNC, starting 59 of his 79 appearances and tallying one goals and 2 assists. Kelly was an obstacle  to the UNC's midfield en route to consecutive NCAA College Cup appearances. He was a second-team All-ACC selection in his senior year.

Professional 
On January 9, 2020, Kelly was selected ninth overall in the 2020 MLS SuperDraft by Montreal Impact. His rights were then immediately traded to Colorado Rapids in exchange for $75,000 of General Allocation Money and the Rapids natural first round selection. 

On February 25, 2020, the Rapids officially announced the signing of Kelly to an initial one-year contract. He made his MLS debut against Real Salt Lake in the MLS is Back Tournament on July 12, 2020. Kelly recorded his first career assist during a 5-0 win versus Real Salt Lake on Sept. 12. He finished his rookie season with one assist in 246 minutes played across eight appearances at right back, two of them starts. In March 2021, Kelly joined Phoenix Rising FC on loan for the 2021 season. 

On July 1, 2021, Kelly was recalled from loan by the Rapids. Following the 2021 season, Colorado opted to decline their contract option on Kelly.

On February 18, 2022, he signed with USL Championship club Memphis 901.

International 
Kelly was named to Tab Ramos' U.S. U-20 squad for camp and two friendlies against New York Cosmos and New York Red Bulls II in July 2016. Kelly scored in stoppage time to defeat NYRBII.

Personal 
Kelly was born in Prague in the Czech Republic, and lived in France until he was 10 years old. He later moved to North Carolina

Career statistics

Club

References

External links 
 Jeremy Kelly at MLSsoccer.com
UNC bio

1997 births
Living people
American soccer players
CF Montréal draft picks
North Carolina Tar Heels men's soccer players
North Carolina FC players
Association football midfielders
Soccer players from North Carolina
North American Soccer League players
United States men's under-20 international soccer players
North Carolina FC U23 players
People from Chapel Hill, North Carolina
San Francisco City FC players
Colorado Rapids players
Phoenix Rising FC players
Memphis 901 FC players
USL Championship players